Bruno III may refer to:

 Bruno III of Berg (Archbishop of Cologne and Duke of Westphalia from 1191 until 1193)
 Bruno III of Isenburg-Braunsberg (Count of Isenburg-Braunsberg from 1255 until 1278)